Jon Beckerman is a producer, director and writer best known for his projects with Rob Burnett. He was born in 1969. He graduated from Shady Side Academy in 1987 and Harvard University in 1991.

Career
Jon's biggest success has been working with Rob Burnett on Late Show with David Letterman and creating the hit dramedy Ed, as well as the ABC comedy The Knights of Prosperity.

References

American male television writers
American television producers
1969 births
Living people
Shady Side Academy alumni
Harvard University alumni